Uchral Nyam-Osor, a Mongolian politician and businessman, has been a member of the State Great Khural since 2016 and is among the young leaders of the Mongolian People's Party, the oldest political party in Mongolia. Nyam-Osor also serves as President of the Social Democracy-Mongolian Youth federation, the largest youth political organization of Mongolia since 2019. He has been serving as a member of the IPU’s Standing Committee on United Nations Affairs. Nyam-Osor is the heir of the Khunnu group companies, which owns Ikh Zasag International University and other businesses in Mongolia.

Uchral Nyam-Osor, born on 2 January 1987, finished his secondary education at Ikh Zasag lyceum in 2003, and then earned a B.A. degree in law in 2007 at Ikh Zasag international university, founded by his father, Mr. Nyam-Osor Namsrai. After graduating, he worked as Vice-Chairman of the university's board of directors. Between 2008-2010, he earned an MBA degree at the University of Gloucestershire, UK. After arriving in Mongolia, he founded the Royal International University. In 2012, Nyam-Osor was elected to serve a four-year term as a citizen's representative of the Bayanzurk district of the Mongolian capital city. In the 2016 parliamentary elections in Mongolia, Uchral Nyam-Osor stood as a candidate for 72nd electoral district from Mongolian People's party and won other 11 candidates. He is a member of standing committees on Legal affairs and Social Policy, Education, Culture, and Science. Nyam-Osor also chairs a temporary committee on digital policy, which he initiated and was created by the State Great Hural (Parliament) in 2017.

Childhood and education 
Uchral Nyam-Osor was born in Ulaanbaatar, the first child of Nyam-Osor Namsrai and Mrs. Tsetsegmaa Jambal. He has had a special interest in poetry from early childhood and wrote several poems. He published his first book, "Heavy rain", a compilation of his poems, in 1997 when he was 10. Six years later, he published his second compilation of 102 poems with the name of "Sky Lake". He is the champion of the "Khurel Tulga", an annual competitive festival between young poets throughout Mongolia. 
He attended 97th secondary school and Ikh zasag lyceum, where he took his upper secondary education. He earned a bachelor's degree of arts in laws at Ikh Zasag international university in 2007 and earned an MBA degree at Gloucestershire university in the United Kingdom. He was an active student and a champion of several debates organized by law universities and the Mongolian bar association.

Nyam-Osor also earned a master's degree in historical sciences at Mongolian State University of Education in 2012. In 2013, he earned his PhD in historical sciences at Siberian Branch of the Russian Academy of Sciences. During his study, he constantly participated in research conferences held in Ulaanbaatar and other Mongolian cities.

Early career 
Nyam-Osor started his career as a vice-chairman of the board of directors of Ikh Zasag International University in 2007. As a young leader of the university, he enhanced foreign cooperation by creating ties with several universities abroad and focused on the fulfillment of international accreditation. In 2010, he founded the Royal International University in order to create an opportunity for students to have world-class education in Mongolia. He was appointed as chairman of the board of directors of Ikh zasag International University in 2015 by a majority of the board members and the educational council.

Political career 
Nyam-Osor joined Mongolian People's Party in 2009 and became an active member of the Social Democracy-Mongolian Youth federation, the largest youth political organization, which has 30 regional branches throughout Mongolia. He became a member of the governing board of Social Democracy-Mongolian Youth federation and was appointed as a director of “Social Democracy” training center of the federation in 2012. Between 2012 and 2016, Nyam-Osor was a citizen's representative of Bayanzurk district of the Mongolian capital city as the result of local elections of 2012. He also served as a director of the Political Department of the Mongolian People’s Party between 2012 and 2014. Moreover, he supervised Mongolian People's Party's Public Relations and media team for the Metropolis election of 2012 and the Presidential election of 2013. In 2015, he worked as an advisor of public relations for the deputy prime minister, Mr. Khurelsukh Ukhnaa, the current Prime minister of Mongolia, and then was appointed as an advisor of the office of Mongolian People's Party caucus in the State Great Hural (Parliament).

In the 2016 parliamentary election of Mongolia, Nyam-Osor stood as a candidate for the 72nd electoral district from Mongolian People's Party and won the other 11 candidates. He is a member of the standing committees on Legal affairs and Social Policy, Education, Culture, Science of the State Great Hural (Parliament). He is also a chairman of a temporary committee on digital policy, which he initiated and created by the State Great Hural (Parliament) in 2017. He currently leads a lobby group for innovation composed of five members of Parliament In the 2020 parliamentary election of Mongolia, Uchral Nyam-Osor was re-elected and continues his job.

References 

Living people
1987 births
Mongolian People's Party politicians
Members of the State Great Khural
Alumni of the University of Gloucestershire
21st-century Mongolian politicians
People from Ulaanbaatar